Trowse was a station on the Great Eastern Main Line just south of Norwich. It was opened around the same time as Norwich Thorpe, and was intended to provide a short commute from the outer suburbs of Norwich.

The bill for the Norwich & Brandon Railway (N&BR) received Royal Assent on 10 May 1844. Work started on the line in 1844 and the line and its stations were opened on 30 July 1845. Trowse station opened with the line and was situated west of Hethersett station. The line temporarily terminated at Trowse. The link into Norwich was delayed due to the need to build a bridge over the River Wensum that kept the river navigable. One month before the N&BR opened a Bill authorising the amalgamation of the Yarmouth & Norwich Railway with the N&BR came into effect and so Trowse station became a Norfolk Railway asset.

On 15 December 1845 a swing bridge over the River Wensum was opened so Trowse ceased to be a terminus and the line from Brandon entered Norwich Station five months after the original line had opened. The Norfolk Railway also opened a line from Trowse towards Yarmouth so freight trains could avoid Norwich Station.

Trowse closed and re-opened several times before closing permanently in 1939. It was briefly re-opened in March 1986 when Norwich was closed for electrification works and it served as the line's northern terminus. It closed again when the works finished.

It is still largely in place, and could be re-opened should it ever be desired. Its close proximity to Norwich station makes this unlikely at present, though discussions regarding a possible re-opening have taken place.

Former Services

See also
 Trowse Bridge
 Norwich Thorpe railway station
 Norwich Victoria railway station

References

Disused railway stations in Norfolk
Former Great Eastern Railway stations
Railway stations in Great Britain opened in 1845
Railway stations in Great Britain closed in 1939
Transport in Norwich
Buildings and structures in Norwich